Kobler is a surname. Notable people with the surname include:

 Andreas Kobler (1816–1892), German historian
 Erich Kobler, German film editor and director
 Martin Kobler (born 1953), German diplomat
 Robert Köbler (1912–1970), German organist

See also
 Kobler Field, airfield in the Northern Mariana Islands
 Köbler v Republik Österreich, 2003 EU lawsuit

Surnames from given names
German-language surnames